William Long (January 24, 1781 – February 22, 1851) was the seventh mayor of Columbus, Ohio.  He served Columbus for over five terms.  His successor was Philo H. Olmsted.  He died on February 22, 1851.

References

Bibliography

External links
William Long at Political Graveyard

Mayors of Columbus, Ohio
1781 births
1851 deaths
Columbus City Council members
19th-century American politicians